Sergei Vladimirovich Ovchinnikov (born 7 December 1984) is a Russian former professional footballer.

Club career
He made his debut in the Russian Premier League in 2002 for FC Lokomotiv Moscow.

Honours
 Russian Premier League champion: 2002.

References

1984 births
People from Gulkevichsky District
Living people
Russian footballers
FC Lokomotiv Moscow players
PFC Spartak Nalchik players
Russian Premier League players
FC Luch Vladivostok players
FC Gornyak Uchaly players
FC SKA-Khabarovsk players
Expatriate footballers in Armenia
Armenian Premier League players
Association football forwards
FC Mashuk-KMV Pyatigorsk players
Sportspeople from Krasnodar Krai